Saint Croix Island may refer to:

Saint Croix Island, Maine, U.S.
St. Croix Island (Algoa Bay), South Africa
Saint Croix, U.S. Virgin Islands

See also
St. Croix (disambiguation)